António de Sousa Marinho e Pinto (born 10 September 1950, in Vila Chã do Marão, Amarante) is a Portuguese lawyer and former journalist. He was president of the Portuguese Bar Association from 2008 to 2013 and is well known for his controversial speeches. In 2014, he ran for the election for the European Parliament as top candidate for the Earth Party (MPT) and succeeded in being elected, along with the second candidate of the list, José Inácio Faria.

References

External links
 

1950 births
Living people
People from Amarante, Portugal
MEPs for Portugal 2014–2019
Democratic Republican Party (Portugal) MEPs
Earth Party MEPs